Jonathan Knight (born 1968) is an American singer.

Jonathan Knight may also refer to:

Jonathan Knight (artist), American painter and artist
Jonathan Knight (physician) (1789–1864), American physician
Jonathan Knight (railroader) (1787–1858), U.S. congressman and railroad engineer
Jonathan C. Knight (born 1964), British physicist

See also
John Knight (disambiguation)